The 2018–19 Vermont Catamounts women's basketball team will represent the University of Vermont during the 2018–19 NCAA Division I women's basketball season. The Catamounts, led by interim head coach Alisa Kresge, play their home games in the Patrick Gym are members in the America East Conference.

Media
All non-televised home games and conference road games will stream on either ESPN3 or AmericaEast.tv. Select home games will be televised by the Northeast Sports Network. Most road games will stream on the opponents website. All games will be broadcast on WVMT 620 AM and streamed online through SportsJuice.com with Rob Ryan calling the action.

Roster

Schedule

|-
!colspan=9 style=| Exhibition

|-
!colspan=9 style=| Non-conference regular season

|-
!colspan=9 style=| America East regular season

|-
!colspan=9 style=| America East Women's Tournament

See also
 2018–19 Vermont Catamounts men's basketball team

References

Vermont
Vermont Catamounts women's basketball seasons
Vermont Catamounts women's basketball
Vermont Catamounts women's basketball